Elise Matthesen (née Krueger; born 1960) is an American essayist, journalist, poet, and  fiction writer (primarily of science fiction and fantasy; she is an active supporter of the interstitial arts movement), an award-winning maker of art jewelry and a long time Bisexual Rights activist. For 13 years she was the companion of the late John M. Ford, until his death in September 2006. She lives in Minneapolis, Minnesota and is a member of the First Universalist Church there.

Early life
Matthesen was born in Wisconsin.

Career
She is an anorexia nervosa survivor as well as a speaker, facilitator, and activist on issues of body acceptance, bisexuality, polyamory, and issues of self-esteem. She was one of the original contributors to the groundbreaking 1991 bisexual anthology Bi Any Other Name, has written for local GLBT magazine Lavender, and is an active member of science fiction fandom.

In 1993 Jane Yolen published Matthesen's short story The Stone Girl in the Xanadu anthology together with works by Tanith Lee and Ursula K. Le Guin. In 2008 Catherine Lundoff published Matthesen's short story Focus of Desire in an anthology of Lesbian ghost stories.

Awards
In 2009, Matthesen was a World Fantasy Award nominee for the Special Award - Non-Professional "for setting out to inspire and for serving as inspiration for works of poetry, fantasy, and SF over the last decade through her jewelry-making and her 'artist's challenges'".

In 2020, she won the Hugo Award for Best Fan Artist, the first artist in a 3-D medium to do so.

References

External links

 
 

1960 births
Living people
21st-century American short story writers
American Unitarian Universalists
American fantasy writers
American science fiction writers
Fat acceptance activists
American jewellers
Bisexual rights activists
American women poets
American essayists
American women journalists
American women essayists
Women science fiction and fantasy writers
American women short story writers
Hugo Award-winning artists
Writers from Minnesota
Writers from Wisconsin
21st-century American poets
Date of birth missing (living people)
21st-century American women writers
Women civil rights activists
Women jewellers